Thomas Joseph Meskill Jr. (January 30, 1928 – October 29, 2007) was a longtime United States circuit judge of the United States Court of Appeals for the Second Circuit. He previously served as the 82nd governor of Connecticut, as a United States representative from Connecticut, and as the mayor of New Britain, Connecticut. He is noted as having served in all three branches of government and at the local, state and federal levels of government during his career of public service.

Biography

Thomas Joseph Meskill was born on January 30, 1928, in New Britain, Connecticut. His father was politically active. Meskill graduated from New Britain High School in 1946. He then attended Bloomfield's St. Thomas Seminary, although his original intention had been to pursue pre-medical studies. He earned a Bachelor of Science degree from Trinity College in Hartford in 1950. After graduation, Meskill enlisted in the United States Air Force and served for three years during the Korean War. He was honorably discharged in 1953 with the rank of first lieutenant. Meskill studied at the New York University School of Law and the University of Connecticut Law School, where he was editor of the Law Review, earning a Bachelor of Laws from the latter institution in 1956, later being admitted to the bar and practicing in New Britain that year.

Political career

In 1958, Meskill made a failed bid for the Connecticut Senate. The following year, Meskill ran for the first time for the office of mayor of New Britain, Connecticut, but was defeated by 116 votes. Meskill served for two years as New Britain's assistant corporation counsel starting in 1960. He then won election and served a term as New Britain's mayor from 1962 to 1964. He was defeated for re-election and also failed in an attempt to win a campaign for Congress that same year. He served as New Britain's corporation counsel from 1965 to 1966. During 1965, Meskill was also a member of a state constitutional convention held in Hartford to draft a new Connecticut State Constitution in accordance with a United States Supreme Court ruling. In 1966, amid a Democratic sweep of the state, he was elected on the Republican Party ticket to serve as Representative for Connecticut's 6th congressional district. He served in the 90th and 91st Congresses, from January 3, 1967, to January 3, 1971. In 1970, Meskill ran for and was elected Governor of Connecticut, defeating Democratic Congressman Emilio Q. Daddario 53.76% to 46.23%. Meskill became the first Republican elected to the position since John Davis Lodge in 1950. He served from January 6, 1971, to January 8, 1975. He was the only Republican party nominee to win an election for governor in Connecticut between 1950 and 1994.

During his term as governor, Connecticut went from a budget deficit of $260 million to a surplus of $65 million. He was also involved in the founding of the Connecticut Department of Environmental Protection and of the Connecticut Lottery. In 1974, with the ongoing Watergate scandal in the background and following severe criticism of his not returning from a Vermont skiing trip during a severe ice storm in Connecticut, Meskill decided not to run for re-election.

Judicial career

On August 8, 1974, President Richard Nixon, in one of the last acts of his presidency, nominated Meskill to serve as a United States Circuit Judge for the Second Circuit, comprising Connecticut, New York, and Vermont. The nomination proved controversial and was not acted on by the United States Senate that year. On January 16, 1975, President Gerald Ford renominated Meskill to be the 38th judge of the United States Court of Appeals for the Second Circuit, succeeding to seat vacated by Judge J. Joseph Smith. The nomination was opposed by many groups including the American Bar Association, which cited his lack of legal experience. Law professors from Meskill's alma mater the University of Connecticut also opposed the nomination stating in a letter to the Senate "it is clear from his record as Governor that he lacks the judicial temperament which might have compensated for his want of experience....As Governor he has repeatedly shown himself insensitive to the rights of the poor and the disadvantaged, and indifferent to civil and political liberties." Nonetheless, Meskill's nomination was confirmed on April 22, 1975, by a 54–36 vote. He was commissioned to his seat the next day. One year later, however, his most ardent critic, Lawrence E. Walsh, who, as President of the American Bar Association had led the opposition to Judge Meskill, publicly admitted his error and called Judge Meskill a "hardworking, able judge." Other organizations that had opposed his appointment would also reverse course by honoring his judicial service. The Connecticut Bar Association awarded Judge Meskill its highest award for judicial service, the Henry J. Naruk Award, in 1994. In that same year, the Federal Bar Council recognized Judge Meskill for his "excellence in federal jurisprudence" by awarding him its Learned Hand Medal. In 1982, the University of Connecticut Law School honored Judge Meskill with its Connecticut Law Review Award, commending him for his "commitment to public service" and for the "intellectual honesty and conviction" that characterized his career.

Meskill remained a judge for the rest of his life. He served as the Second Circuit's Chief Judge from 1992 to 1993. Meskill assumed senior status on the court on June 30, 1993, which he retained until his death some 32 years after he took the bench.

Noteworthy cases

Judge Meskill participated in many influential rulings during his tenure on the Court, including several adopted by the United States Supreme Court. Among his noteworthy rulings, in Barnes v. Jones (2d Cir. 1981), a criminal case, Judge Meskill disagreed with the majority, stating that appointed counsel should not have to present all non-frivolous arguments requested by his client. The United States Supreme Court agreed with Judge Meskill and reversed the Second Circuit majority, holding that an indigent defendant did not have a constitutional right to compel appointed counsel to press non-frivolous points, where, as a matter of professional judgment, counsel chose not to do so. Judge Meskill's dissenting opinion prevailed in two other Second Circuit cases in which the Supreme Court granted certiorari, Herbert v. Lando (2d Cir. 1977), and Harper & Row Publishers, Inc. v. Nation Enters. (2d Cir. 1983). In Herbert v. Lando, the majority concluded that, in a defamation suit brought by a public figure, the First Amendment affords a privilege to disclosure of a journalist's exercise of editorial control and judgment. Judge Meskill predicted the Supreme Court's rejection of the majority's "new constitutional privilege"; the Supreme Court reversed the Second Circuit, affording no absolute privilege to the editorial process of a media defendant in a libel case. Similarly, in Harper & Row Publishers, the Second Circuit concluded over Judge Meskill's dissent that the publication of verbatim excerpts from former President Ford's unpublished memoir constituted a "fair use" under the Copyright Act, as the excerpts involved important matters of state. The Supreme Court disagreed and again sided with Judge Meskill, concluding that the fact that excerpts were newsworthy did not alone shield the publisher from copyright liability.

Personal life
Meskill married Mary Grady; they had five children.

Meskill died in Boynton Beach, Florida on October 29, 2007, at the age of 79. At the time of his passing, Meskill had homes in Berlin, Connecticut and Delray Beach, Florida. The Law library at the University of Connecticut Law School is named posthumously after Meskill.

References

External links
 
 

1928 births
2007 deaths
Republican Party governors of Connecticut
Judges of the United States Court of Appeals for the Second Circuit
United States court of appeals judges appointed by Gerald Ford
20th-century American judges
Mayors of New Britain, Connecticut
Connecticut lawyers
Trinity College (Connecticut) alumni
University of Connecticut School of Law alumni
Republican Party members of the United States House of Representatives from Connecticut
New York University School of Law alumni
20th-century American politicians
People from Berlin, Connecticut